Óscar Benítez may refer to:

 Óscar Benítez (footballer, born 1948), Salvadoran footballer and football manager
 Óscar Benítez (footballer, born 1993), Argentine football winger for Atlético Tucumán